Robert Douglas Cummings (17 November 1935 – 26 August 2008) was an English professional footballer who scored 31 goals from 62 appearances in the Scottish League for Aberdeen and 69 goals from 170 appearances in the Football League playing for Newcastle United, Darlington and Hartlepools United. He played as a centre forward or outside right. He also played in the South African National Football League for Port Elizabeth City.

Career
Cummings was born in Ashington, Northumberland, in 1935. He began his football career as a youngster with Newcastle United but was released before reaching the first team and signed for Ashington. The club record he set of 60 goals in 1958–59, as Ashington finished second to Peterborough United in the Midland League, still stands, and his goalscoring earned him a move to Aberdeen.

Cummings first joined Aberdeen on a part-time basis, continuing to work as a coal miner at Bates Colliery, at Blyth, Northumberland, to ensure his exemption from National Service. He made his Scottish League debut on 1 March 1960 against Rangers and a year later, playing at outside right, he became only the third Aberdeen player, and first Englishman, to score a hat-trick against that club. In the 1962–63 season, he scored 23 goals in all competitions, and ended his Aberdeen career in October 1963 with 47 goals from 87 games in all competitions. In October 1963, Cummings played as a guest and scored for a Newcastle United XI in a testimonial match for Alf McMichael, and five days later he signed for the club for a £5,000 fee.

He stayed with Newcastle for two seasons, scoring 14 goals from 44 games. In the 1964–65 season, he was second in the club's scoring charts, with 8 goals behind Ron McGarry's 16, and made a significant contribution to their promotion to the First Division. He played little in the top flight, and in October 1965, dropped down to the Fourth Division to become Darlington's £6,000 record signing.

Cummings scored twice on his Darlington debut, in a 3–0 defeat of Stockport County, and went on to become the club's top scorer for the 1965–66 season as they gained promotion for the first time in more than 40 years. In two-and-a-half seasons he scored 46 goals, but by early 1968 he was not being selected regularly, and was persuaded to return to Division Four with nearby Hartlepools United for a £1,000 fee. His 9 goals from 18 games helped Hartlepools to third place, and consequent promotion to the Third Division. He played regularly at the higher level, but scored only three times, and then went to South Africa to play in the National Football League for Port Elizabeth City.

On his return from South Africa he settled back in his native north-east of England, where he collapsed and died in August 2008 at the age of 72.

References

1935 births
Sportspeople from Ashington
Footballers from Northumberland
2008 deaths
English footballers
Association football forwards
Newcastle United F.C. players
Ashington A.F.C. players
Aberdeen F.C. players
Darlington F.C. players
Hartlepool United F.C. players
Port Elizabeth City F.C. players
Midland Football League players
English Football League players
Scottish Football League players
National Football League (South Africa) players